Novouptino (Yañı Opto) is a rural locality (a selo) in Novotroitsky Selsoviet, Chishminsky District, Bashkortostan, Russia. The population was 33 as of 2010. There is 1 street.

Geography 
Novouptino is located 21 km south of Chishmy (the district's administrative centre) by road. Alexandrovka is the nearest rural locality.

References 

Rural localities in Chishminsky District